Kaspars Astašenko (17 February 1975 – 20 November 2012) was a Latvian professional ice hockey player. Astašenko was born in Riga, Latvia. Astašenko was drafted by the Tampa Bay Lightning in the 1999 NHL Entry Draft, 127th overall. Astašenko played parts of two seasons in the National Hockey League with the Lightning.

Playing career

Junior

Astašenko began his career in his native Riga with HK Pārdaugava Rīga, competing in both the Latvian top league and later to Russian Superleague before signing with Russian club, HC CSKA Moscow in 1995.

North America
In 1998, Astašenko signed with the Cincinnati Cyclones of the International Hockey League. After a stint with the Cyclones, Astašenko was surprisingly drafted by Tampa Bay and went on to play 23 regular games in the National Hockey League (NHL) for the Lightning as well as playing for the IHL's Detroit Vipers and Long Beach Ice Dogs.  He later played in the American Hockey League for the Springfield Falcons and the Lowell Lock Monsters.

Europe
He would return to Europe in 2003, with stops at Finland's SM-liiga with Ilves and HPK, back in Russia with Khimik Voskresensk, the Slovak Extraliga with HC Slovan Bratislava, Ritten Sport of Italy's Serie A and the United Kingdom's Elite Ice Hockey League for the Belfast Giants as well as brief spells in his native Latvia and the lower leagues in Finland.

International play
Astašenko played for the Latvian national team in the Ice Hockey World Championships in 2001 and 2006, as well as the 2002 Winter Olympics in Salt Lake City.

Personal life
In 2003, Astašenko was arrested for possession of heroin in the United States, effectively ending his North American career. After suffering from various addictions, Astašenko died on 20 November 2012.

Career statistics

Regular season and playoffs

International

References

External links

1975 births
2012 deaths
Belfast Giants players
Cincinnati Cyclones (IHL) players
HC CSKA Moscow players
Dayton Bombers players
Detroit Vipers players
HPK players
Ilves players
Latvian ice hockey defencemen
Long Beach Ice Dogs (IHL) players
Lowell Lock Monsters players
Olympic ice hockey players of Latvia
Ice hockey players at the 2002 Winter Olympics
Ice hockey people from Riga
HC Slovan Bratislava players
Springfield Falcons players
Tampa Bay Lightning draft picks
Tampa Bay Lightning players
Latvian expatriate ice hockey people
Latvian expatriate sportspeople in Russia
Latvian expatriate sportspeople in the United States
Latvian expatriate sportspeople in Finland
Latvian expatriate sportspeople in Denmark
Latvian expatriate sportspeople in Slovakia
Latvian expatriate sportspeople in Italy
Latvian expatriate sportspeople in Kazakhstan
Latvian expatriate sportspeople in Northern Ireland
Expatriate ice hockey players in Northern Ireland
Expatriate ice hockey players in Finland
Expatriate ice hockey players in Denmark
Expatriate ice hockey players in Italy
Expatriate ice hockey players in Kazakhstan
Expatriate ice hockey players in Russia
Expatriate ice hockey players in the United States
Expatriate ice hockey players in Slovakia